Narendra Chandra Debbarma (28 August 1942 – 1 January 2023) was an Indian politician who was the president of the Indigenous Peoples Front of Tripura and director of All India Radio, Agartala. He was from Tripura.

Debbarma allied his party with BJP in the 2018 Tripura Legislative Assembly election and won 8 seats out of 9 which constituted 7.5% of the total votes polled.

Death
Debbarma died at Agartala Hospital on 1 January 2023, at the age of 80 due to suffered from massive cerebral stroke.

References 

1942 births
2023 deaths
All India Radio people
Tripura politicians
Leaders of political parties in India
Indigenous Peoples Front of Tripura politicians
State cabinet ministers of Tripura
Tripura MLAs 2018–2023
Recipients of the Padma Shri in public affairs